In molecular biology, SNORD72 (also known as HBII-240) belongs to the C/D family of snoRNAs.
It is the human orthologue of the mouse MBII-240 and is predicted to guide 2'O-ribose methylation of the large 28S rRNA at residue U4590.

References

External links 
 

Small nuclear RNA